The women's 1500 metres competition of the athletics events at the 2011 Pan American Games took place on the 27th October at the Telmex Athletics Stadium.  The defending Pan American Games champion, Juliana Paula dos Santos of Brazil, did not compete.

Records
Prior to this competition, the existing world and Pan American Games records were as follows:

Qualification
Each National Olympic Committee (NOC) was able to enter one athlete regardless if they had met the qualification standard.  To enter two entrants both athletes had to have met the minimum standard (4:25.0) in the qualifying period (January 1, 2010 to September 14, 2011).

Schedule

Results
All times shown are in seconds.

Final
Held on October 27.

References

Athletics at the 2011 Pan American Games
2011
2011 in women's athletics